Louis Boyard (born 26 August 2000) is a French politician from La France Insoumise. He has been Member of Parliament for Val-de-Marne's 3rd constituency since 2022 French legislative election. He defeated Laurent Saint-Martin and is the second youngest MP in French history.

See also 

 List of deputies of the 16th National Assembly of France

References 

2000 births
Living people
21st-century French politicians
La France Insoumise politicians
Deputies of the 16th National Assembly of the French Fifth Republic
People from Fontenay-le-Comte
Politicians from Pays de la Loire